Rabbi Nathan may refer to:

Nathan the Babylonian, 2nd-century rabbinic sage from the Land of Israel, son of a Babylonian exilarch
Nathan ben Isaac HaBabli, 10th-century Babylonian Jewish historian
Nathan ben Jehiel, 11th-century Italian lexicographer
Nathan ben Abraham I, 11th-century President of the Academy in the Land of Israel
Nathan ben Eliezer ha-Me'ati, 13th-century Italian translator
Nathan of Gaza, 17th-century theologian
Nathan of Breslov, 19th-century hasidic rabbi